Southern Parkway may refer to:

 Southern Parkway (Queens), part of the Belt System
 Southern Parkway (Louisville, Kentucky)
 Utah State Route 7, a highway in southern Utah named Southern Parkway

See also
 Southern State Parkway on Long Island